Liat Ron is an actress, dancer and dance instructor born to an Iraqi Jewish mother and a Russian Jewish father. Reflecting her cultural heritage she began her Middle Eastern dance journey by training with Israel’s prime dancer Elina Pechersky. She later trained with Yousry Sharif at the Egyptian Academy of Oriental Dance, in New York. She has incorporated many of her Middle Eastern dance skills into plays, as she believes it's the ultimate form of dance for women. She often attends social events to dance in both New York City and Tel Aviv.

Filmography
 Acharnians - played Dikaiopolis
 Seven Layers of Skin
 The Eternal Triangle
 Nocturnia 
 Blue Candy Lights 
 Covergirls 
 Crush Landing
 The Dangers of Tobacco

Trivia
 She made an appearance in the music video for Big Yellow Taxi by Counting Crows

References

External links
Official site

http://apaclassics.org/outreach/amphora/2004/Amphora3.2.pdf

Israeli film actresses
Israeli female dancers
Israeli Jews
Israeli people of Iraqi-Jewish descent
Living people
Israeli people of Russian-Jewish descent
Year of birth missing (living people)